Awakening of Faith in the Mahāyāna (reconstructed Sanskrit title: Mahāyāna śraddhotpādaśāstra) is a text of Mahayana Buddhism. Though attributed to the Indian master Aśvaghoṣa, no Sanskrit version of it exists and it is now widely regarded by scholars as a Chinese composition.

Origin and authorship
While the text is traditionally attributed to Aśvaghoṣa, no Sanskrit version of the text is extant. The two earliest existing versions are written in Chinese, and contemporary scholars widely accept the theory that the text is a Chinese composition.

However, D.T. Suzuki accepted its Indian Sanskrit origin, while acknowledging that it was unlikely the historical Aśvaghoṣa was the author, and that it was more likely that the attribution to Aśvaghoṣa was an honorific appellation due to the profundity of the treatise. Suzuki saw the Awakening of Faith as being "inspired by the same spirit" as the Lankavatara, Avatamsaka, and the Mahayana Parinirvana Sutras, and regarded its identification as a Chinese text as "not well grounded". Suzuki's views were written before modern computer assisted analysis could be undertaken by scholars.

Paramartha (499–569) was traditionally thought to have translated the text in the 6th century CE in 553. However, some modern scholars opine it was composed by Paramartha or one of his students. King remarks that, although Paramartha undoubtedly was among the most prolific translators of Sanskrit texts into Chinese, he may have composed the Buddha-nature Treatise as well as the Awakening of Faith.

Other experts dispute that it has anything to do at all with Paramartha. The authors of a recent translation write that "there is now wide consensus that the author of the Treatise was strongly influenced by the terminology and language of Bodhiruci (d. ca. 535)." The Awakening of Faith draws on much of the ideas and specific terms found in Bodhiruci's translations, such as his Laṅkāvatāra-sūtra and his translation of Vasubandhu's Commentary on the Ten Stages Sutra. As such "one theory is that the Treatise was written by someone in Bodhiruci’s circle." A candidate for the authorship of the Awakening of Faith is Tanlin 曇 林, who was "an amanuensis of Bodhiruci and a scholar of Tathāgatagarbha material."

A later translation or reedited version was attributed to the Khotanese monk  (active 695–700).

Title 
The term Mahayana points not to the Mahayana school, but to tathatā "suchness" or "the Absolute":

Charles Muller argues that the terminology "faith in" is misleading:

In other words, the treatise is not discussing "Faith in the Mahayana," rather it is presenting the Mahayana style of faith, which is faith in the true suchness of mind.

Content 
The text is divided into five sections, and often summarized as “One Mind, Two Aspects, Three Greatnesses, Four Faiths, and Five Practices". Following two introductory chapters dealing with the oneness of mind and motivations for the text's composition, part three focuses on two aspects of mind to clarify the relationship between enlightenment and ignorance, nirvana and samsara, or the absolute and the phenomenal. Part four describes five practices that aid in the growth of faith, emphasizing calmness and insight meditation. Part five describes the benefits that result from cultivating the five practices.

According to the Awakening of Faith:‘Consciousness has two aspects which embrace all states of existence and create all states of existence. They are: (1) the aspect of enlightenment, and (2) the aspect of nonenlightenment.’ Written from the perspective of Essence-Function philosophy, this text sought to harmonize the two soteriological philosophies of the Buddha-nature (tathagatagarbha) and the Eight Consciousnesses (or Yogacara) into a synthetic vision based on the "One Mind in Two Aspects" doctrine. According to Whalen Lai, this doctrine holds that "self and world, mind and suchness, are integrally one. Everything is a carrier of that a priori enlightenment; all incipient enlightenment is predicated on it."

Paul Williams explains the main teaching of the Awakening of Faith thus:The Awakening of Faith itself takes the tathagatagarbha as the substratum of samsara and nirvana. This Mind has two aspects – the Mind as Suchness or Thusness, that is, the Absolute Reality itself, and the Mind as phenomena. Between them these two aspects embrace all there is....The essential nature of the Mind is unborn, imperishable, beyond language. Differentiation (i.e. phenomena) arises through illusion, fundamental ignorance of one’s true nature...The Absolute Reality is empty, ‘Because from the beginning it has never been related to any defiled states of existence, it is free from all marks of individual distinction of things, and it has nothing to do with thoughts conceived by a deluded mind’. Nevertheless, to avoid misunderstandings, ‘the true Mind is eternal, permanent, immutable, pure, and self-sufficient; therefore it is called “nonempty.”’

Commentaries
Commentaries on the Awakening in Faith were composed in China, Japan, and Korea by numerous exegetes. Commentaries composed before the mid 9th century in Chinese and Korean include those by Jingying Huiyuan 淨影慧遠 Taisho Tripitaka Vol. 44, No. 1843 大乘起信論義疏 Dasheng qixinlun yishu; two by Wonhyo 元曉 Taisho Tripitaka Vol. 44, No. 1844 起信論疏  Gisillon so and Taisho Tripitaka Vol. 44, No. 1845 Daeseung gisillon byeolgi; by Fazang 法藏 Taisho Tripitaka Vol. 44, No. 1846 大乘起信論義記 Dasheng qixinlun yiji; and by Zongmi 宗密, as well as others no longer extant.

Influence
Although often omitted from lists of canonical Buddhist texts, the Awakening of Faith strongly influenced subsequent Mahayana doctrine. It reflects an important stage in the synthesis of Indian and Chinese Buddhist thought, and the elevation of the tathagatagarbha doctrine to a central place in Chinese Buddhist soteriology.

Chinese Buddhism
The Awakening of Faith in the Mahayana had a great influence on Chinese Buddhism. One of the reasons for this is the status of the commentator Fazang 法藏 as state preceptor (Guoshi) and third patriarch of the Huayan school. The Awakening of Faith is thought to have played a role in the Huayan doctrine of the interpenetration of phenomena.

Korean Buddhism
In great part due to the commentaries by Wonhyo, the Awakening of Faith ended up having an unusually powerful influence in Korea, where it may be the most oft-cited text in the entire tradition. It also provided much of the doctrinal basis for the original enlightenment thought found in the Sutra of Perfect Enlightenment.

Chan (Zen)
The view of the mind in the Awakening of Faith had a significant import on the doctrinal development of the East Mountain Teaching. It is also considered to have strongly influenced the Chan doctrine of "seeing one's nature and attaining Buddhahood" (jianxing chengfo).

Japanese Buddhism
In Tendai, it is often used to explain the original enlightenment thought (doctrine). Medieval Tendai Original Enlightenment Thought is established. It indirectly influenced the sects of the Kamakura period.

Modern Confucianism
Mou Zongsan (Chinese: 牟宗三) has used this and Tien Tai to develop his school of thought related to Confucianism, in particular about how to tie between two different aspects of the world.

English translations

The Awakening of Faith
The translations by Hakeda and Jorgensen et al. are based on Paramārtha's version of the Chinese text (Taisho No. 1666) while Suzuki's translation is based on Śikṣānanda's version (Taisho No. 1667). 
 
 Jorgensen, John; Lusthaus, Dan; Makeham, John; Strange, Mark, trans. (2019), Treatise on Awakening Mahāyāna Faith, New York, NY: Oxford University Press,

Commentaries
Vorenkamp's translation of Fazang's commentary includes a translation of Paramārtha's version.

Notes

References

Footnotes

Sources

 
 
 Jorgensen, John; Lusthaus, Dan; Makeham, John; Strange, Mark, trans. (2019), Treatise on Awakening Mahāyāna Faith, New York, NY: Oxford University Press,

External links

Dictionaries
 Entry in the Dictionary of East Asian Buddhist Terms
 Entry in Soothill and Hodous Dictionary of Chinese Buddhist Terms
 Digital Dictionary of Buddhism (log in with userID "guest")

Translations
 Chinese text of the Awakening of Faith (大乘起信論) by Paramārtha provided by Chinese Buddhist Electronic Text Association
 Chinese text of the Awakening of Faith (大乘起信論) by Śiksānanda provided by Chinese Buddhist Electronic Text Association
 Chinese text of the Treatise on the Awakening of Faith in the Mahāyāna (大乘起信論) by Paramārtha provided by NTI Buddhist Text Reader
 Chinese text of the Treatise on the Awakening of Faith in the Mahāyāna (大乘起信論) by Śiksānanda provided by NTI Buddhist Text Reader

Mahayana sutras
Buddha-nature
Post-canonical Buddhist texts
Buddhism in China
Chinese Buddhist texts